Laurencetown or Lawrencetown  is a small village in County Down, Northern Ireland. It sits on the River Bann, along the main road between the towns of Banbridge and Portadown. It is within the parish of Tullylish and covers the townlands of Knocknagore and Drumnascamph. In the 2011 census it had a population of 956 people. In Irish, it is known as Baile Labhráis (Lawrence's Townland).

Places of interest
Lawrencetown House, close to the village, was built before 1834 and features a walled garden and extensive lawns stretching to the River Bann.

Lawrenctown park, between the Federal Tyres and Nearby Lawrenctown.

People
John Butler Yeats (1839-1922), an Irish artist and the father of William Butler Yeats and Jack Butler Yeats was born here
Lawrencetown was also the birthplace of William Dawson Lawrence (1817-1886), a successful shipbuilder, businessman and politician in Canada, who is reported to have built the largest wooden ship in the world in 1874

Demographics
 956 Population [2011] – Census
0.3717 km2 Area
2,572/km2 Population Density
4.3% Annual Population Change [2001 → 2011]
Country of Birth (C 2011)

Northern Ireland	887
Great Britain	29
Republic of Ireland	21
EU (other)	5
Other country	9

Ethnic Group (C 2011)

White	948
Asian	2
Mixed/multiple	1

Religion (C 2011)

Roman Catholic	703
Christian (other)	141
Other religion	11
No religion	34

Main Language (C 2011)

English	895
Polish	1
Other language	4

Education 
St. Colman's Primary School: Founded in the 20th century

Sport 
Lawrencetown is home to Tullylish GAA club, which was formed in July 1944 and originally called 'St Patrick's GAA club'
Tullylish Running Club: Formed in 2017 by Shauna Corbett
Lawrencetown also had a football team called "Lawrencetown Celtic" c.1920

See also 
List of villages in Northern Ireland
List of towns in Northern Ireland

References

External links

Tullylish GAA Club

Villages in County Down
Civil parish of Tullylish